Hinchingham is a historic home located at Rock Hall, Kent County, Maryland, United States.  It is a -story brick house with a -story brick wing, situated directly on the shore of Chesapeake Bay.  It was built in 1774.

Hinchingham was listed on the National Register of Historic Places in 1975.

References

External links
, including photo in 1974, at Maryland Historical Trust

Houses on the National Register of Historic Places in Maryland
Houses completed in 1774
Houses in Kent County, Maryland
National Register of Historic Places in Kent County, Maryland